Anthony Xuereb (born 28 June 1970) is an Australian former professional rugby league footballer who played for the Penrith Panthers and Western Suburbs in the New South Wales Rugby League premiership. To date, he is one of only two players in the history of the game (the other being Bronson Xerri) with a last name beginning with the letter "X".

Background
Xuereb was born in Penrith, New South Wales. He grew up living in the suburbs of Tregear and Mount Druitt. He attended Tregear Primary School and Dunheved High School. He has an older sister named Kim (b. 1968).

Playing career
Xuereb made his first grade debut for Penrith in round 10 1991 against St. George at Penrith Park.

Following their 1991 grand final victory, Xuereb traveled with the Penrith to England for the 1991 World Club Challenge which was lost to Wigan.

In 1992, Xuereb joined Western Suburbs but only played two games for the club before heading back to Penrith.

Xuereb's final game in the top grade came against Eastern Suburbs in round 18 1994 at the Sydney Football Stadium which Penrith lost 30–8. He was released by the Penrith club at the end of the 1994 season and subsequently never played first grade again.

International

Career playing statistics

Point scoring summary

References

1970 births
Living people
Australian people of Maltese descent
Australian rugby league players
Malta national rugby league team players
Penrith Panthers players
Rugby league players from Penrith, New South Wales
Western Suburbs Magpies players